William "Bucky" Baxter (1955May 25, 2020) was an American guitarist.  He is best known as a member of Steve Earle and The Dukes and as a member of Bob Dylan's backing band in the mid-90s during the Never Ending Tour.  He released his only solo album, Most Likely, No Problem, in 1999.

Early life
Baxter was born in Melbourne, Florida, in 1955.  He started learning how to play pedal steel guitar in the 1970s.  In the following decade, he met Steve Earle and played in the latter's debut album, Guitar Town, in 1986.

Career
Baxter was a founding member of The Dukes, Earle's backing band.  He subsequently featured in three other albums by Earle – Exit 0 (1987), Copperhead Road (1988) and The Hard Way (1990) – providing vocals and guitar.  It was on one of Earle's concert tours in the early 1990s that he first encountered Bob Dylan, who asked Baxter to give him lessons in how to play steel guitar.  He played pedal steel guitar for Dylan's band on his Never Ending Tour from 1992 to 1999 and played pedal steel on Dylan's 1997 Grammy Award winning album, Time Out of Mind.  After his time in Dylan's band came to an end, Baxter released a solo album, Most Likely, No Problem, in 1999.  He was one of three co-founders of Moontoast, a social rich media advertising platform.

Baxter also appeared on various albums by artists including Ryan Adams, R.E.M., Beastie Boys and Joe Henry.  In studio, or while performing live, Baxter played steel guitar, acoustic guitar, electric guitar, mandolin, dobro.

Death
Baxter died on May 25, 2020, in Sanibel Island, Florida, at the age of 65, according to his son, Rayland. No cause was given.

Discography
Source:

References

Gray, Michael. The Bob Dylan Encyclopedia, 2006, p. 41

External links
 

1955 births
2020 deaths
People from Melbourne, Florida
Pedal steel guitarists
Guitarists from New Jersey
Guitarists from Florida
American male guitarists